Randy Florke  (born December 19, 1962) is an American real estate and design executive specialized in country style. He is the owner of a real estate business, The Rural Connection, based in Sullivan County, New York and has written books on interior design.

Early life and career 
Florke was born on a farm in Iowa to a family of German descent. He graduated from Washington High School in 1981. Florke moved to New York City at the age of eighteen to model and enroll in a fashion course. He later started a real estate business, The Rural Connection, which sells homes in Sullivan County, New York. Florke has written articles for Country Living. He has authored books on interior design.

A spring 2007 profile in O, The Oprah Magazine reported that Florke, a decorator and author, manages six houses and owned a brokerage business and construction company. Florke starred in an A&E reality show about his real estate business.

Personal life 
Florke has been with his husband Sean Patrick Maloney since 1992, when they met in New York City, where Maloney was helping plan the Democratic National Convention. They have adopted three children. Florke and his family live in Cold Spring, New York. Florke and Maloney became engaged on December 25, 2013. They married in Cold Spring on June 21, 2014.

Selected works

References 

Living people
Businesspeople from Iowa
Businesspeople from New York City
American real estate brokers
American construction businesspeople
American LGBT businesspeople
American gay writers
LGBT people from Iowa
LGBT people from New York (state)
People from Cold Spring, New York
21st-century American male writers
Writers from New York (state)
American people of German descent
21st-century American LGBT people
20th-century American LGBT people
21st-century American businesspeople
1962 births